Organic is the fifteenth studio album by Joe Cocker, released on 14 October 1996 in the UK.

The album sees Cocker return to his musical roots with a collection of new recordings of some of his own classics, including "You Are So Beautiful", "Delta Lady" and "Many Rivers To Cross", coupled with fresh interpretations of Van Morrison's "Into The Mystic", Bob Dylan's "Dignity" and Stevie Wonder's "You And I".

The Organic sessions were guided by producer Don Was and included performances from such musicians as Jim Keltner, Billy Preston, Chris Stainton, Dean Parks and Randy Newman.

The album was showcased in Europe throughout October 1996 with a band featuring Jim Keltner, Chris Stainton, Dean Parks, Greg Leisz, James "Hutch" Hutchinson, Stacy Campbell and occasionally Tony Joe White, culminating in three special performances at Shepherd's Bush Empire on 30 and 31 October and 1 November that year.

Track listing
"Into the Mystic" – 3:31 (Van Morrison)
"Bye Bye Blackbird" – 3:31 (Morton Dixon, Ray Henderson)
"Delta Lady" – 3:16 (Leon Russell)
"Heart Full of Rain" – 4:48 (Michael Dan Ehmig, Tony Joe White)
"Don't Let Me Be Misunderstood" – 3:52 (Bennie Benjamin, Gloria Caldwell, Sol Marcus)
"Many Rivers to Cross" – 4:23 (Jimmy Cliff)
"High Lonesome Blue" – 4:10 (Cocker, Tony Joe White)
"Sail Away" – 3:00 (Randy Newman)
"You and I" – 4:35 (Stevie Wonder)
"Darling Be Home Soon" – 4:11 (John Sebastian)
"Dignity" – 3:13 (Bob Dylan)
"You Can Leave Your Hat On" – 3:46 (Newman)
"You Are So Beautiful" – 2:43 (Bruce Fisher, Billy Preston)
"Can't Find My Way Home" – 3:53 (Steve Winwood)
"Human Touch" – 3:46 (Bruce Springsteen)
"Anybody Seen My Girl" – 3:02 (Kevin Moore)
"Something" – 3:18 (George Harrison)

 Tracks 15–17 are bonus tracks released only on a single "Don't Let Me Be Misunderstood".

Singles
"Into the Mystic" / "Have a Little Faith in Me" / "Unchain My Heart" (90's vsn) / "Highway Highway" (France, 1996)
"Don't Let Me Be Misunderstood" / "Human Touch" / "Anybody Seen My Girl" / "You Can Leave Your Hat On" (France, 1996)
"Don't Let Me Be Misunderstood" / "Human Touch" / "Anybody Seen My Girl" (UK, 1996)
"Don't Let Me Be Misunderstood" / "Something" / "High Lonesome Blue" (UK, 1996)

Personnel 

 Joe Cocker – lead vocals (all tracks)
 Jamie Muhoberac – synthesizers (1-6, 8, 9, 10, 12-14), Hammond B3 organ (10)
 Billy Preston – Hammond B3 organ (1-5, 8, 9, 11, 12, 14)
 Chris Stainton – Wurlitzer electric piano (1, 10), acoustic piano (2-6, 11, 14)
 Randy Newman – acoustic piano (8)
 Dean Parks – acoustic guitar (1-6, 8-14)
 Johnny Lee Schell – electric guitar (1-3, 5, 6, 8, 10-12)
 Greg Leisz – dobro guitar (1, 3, 5, 6, 11)
 Tony Joe White – electric guitar (4, 7), harmonica (4, 7)
 James "Hutch" Hutchinson – bass (1-3, 5, 6, 8, 10-13)
 Darryl Jones – bass (4, 7, 9, 14)
 Kenny Aronoff – drums and percussion (all tracks)
 Jim Keltner – drums and percussion (all tracks)
 Joe Porcaro – percussion (12)
 David Campbell – string arrangements and conductor (6, 8, 9, 13)
 Suzie Katayama – cello (6, 8, 9, 13)
 Rudy Stein – cello (6, 8, 9, 13)
 Denyse Buffum – viola (6, 8, 9, 13)
 Evan Wilson – viola (6, 8, 9, 13)
 Peter Kent – violin (6, 8, 9, 13)
 Sid Page – violin (6, 8, 9, 13)
 Merry Clayton – backing vocals (2, 3, 5, 12)
 Portia Griffin – backing vocals (2, 3, 5, 12)
 Maxine Sharp – backing vocals (2, 3, 5, 12)
 Myrna Smith – backing vocals (2, 3, 5, 12)

Production 

 Producer – Don Was
 Assistant Producer – Jane Oppenheimer 
 Recorded and Mixed by Rik Pekkonen at Ocean Way Recording (Los Angeles, CA).
 Second Engineer – Greg Burns
 Assistant Engineers – Jeff DeMorris and Richard Huredia
 Mastered by Stephen Marcussen at Precision Mastering (Los Angeles, CA).
 Art Direction and Design – Norman Moore 
 Photography – Linda Barcojo
 Management – Roger Davies
 Business Management – Gary Haber and Arlene Katz
 Agents and Representatives – Stacy Fass, Carol Kinzel, Barrie Marshall and Ray Neopolitan.

Certifications

!scope="row"|Worldwide (IFPI)
|
|1,000,000+ 
|-

References

1996 albums
Joe Cocker albums
Albums arranged by David Campbell (composer)
Albums produced by Don Was
A&M Records albums
Covers albums